Túpac Huallpa (or Huallpa Túpac) (1510 – October 1533), original name Auqui Huallpa Túpac, was the first vassal Sapa Inca installed by the Spanish conquistadors, during the Spanish conquest of the Inca Empire led by Francisco Pizarro.

Life
Túpac Huallpa, born in 1510 in Cusco, was a younger brother of Atahualpa and Huáscar. After Atahualpa's execution on 26 July 1533, the Spaniards appointed Túpac Huallpa as a puppet ruler and ensured he was crowned with great recognition and ceremony. All this was done to convince the Inca people that they were still being ruled by an Inca. 
Túpac died in Jauja during October 1533. He was succeeded by another brother, Manco Inca Yupanqui.

Descendants
Túpac Huallpa was the father of at least five children:
 Francisco Huallpa Túpac Yupanqui;
 Beatriz Túpac Yupanqui, who married the conquistador Pedro Alvarez de Holguín de Ulloa (1490–1542), son of Pedro Alvarez de Golfín and his wife Constanza de Aldana, and had issue 
 Palla Chimpu Ocllo, baptized as Isabel Suárez Chimpu Ocllo, who married Sebastián Garcilaso de la Vega y Vargas, and was the mother of Inca Garcilaso de la Vega. After she was widowed, she married secondly Juan de Pedroche and had two daughters: one, Ana Ruíz, married her cousin Martín de Bustinza, and had issue, while the other, Luisa de Herrera, married Pedro Márquez de Galeoto, becoming the mother of Alonso Márquez de Figueroa.
 Leonor Yupanqui, who married Juan Ortiz de Zárate, and had issue.
 Francisca Palla, who married the conquistador Juan Munoz de Collantes, born at The Palacio de la Alhambra, Granada, Spain. Together they had a daughter, called Mencia Munoz de Collantes Palla.

References

Inca emperors
Deaths from smallpox
16th-century births
1533 deaths
Infectious disease deaths in Peru
16th-century monarchs in South America